Hokkaido Sapporo Kaisei High School (北海道札幌開成高等学校, Hokkaidō Sapporo Kaisei Kōtō Gakkō) is a high school in Sapporo, Hokkaido, Japan, founded in 1962.

Notable alumni
Masaki Yamada (山田 雅樹) Japanese musician

Address
Address: Higashi 21-1-1, Kita 22, Higashi-ku, Sapporo, Hokkaido, Japan

External links
Official website

High schools in Hokkaido
Educational institutions established in 1962
1962 establishments in Japan